Terry Peder Rasmussen (December 23, 1943 – December 28, 2010) was an American serial killer. Rasmussen killed at least six people in a series of crimes that spanned decades and stretched across the continental United States. Due to his use of many aliases, most notably "Bob Evans", Rasmussen is known as "The Chameleon Killer".

Rasmussen is the suspected perpetrator of the Bear Brook murders. The bodies of his girlfriend, California woman Marlyse Elizabeth Honeychurch, her two daughters, and his own daughter were discovered in two barrels in Allenstown, New Hampshire, in 1985 and 2000. He had settled in nearby Manchester, New Hampshire, under the alias "Bob Evans" in the late 1970s. As Evans, he dated Denise Beaudin, who disappeared in 1981. Beaudin's daughter was abducted by Rasmussen and taken to California, where he raised her under the pseudonym "Gordon Jensen". He abandoned her in 1986 and was subsequently imprisoned on child abandonment charges. After his release, he assumed the name "Larry Vanner" and began living with chemist Eunsoon Jun in 2001. He died in prison in 2010 after being convicted of her 2002 murder.

Although the Allenstown barrels were discovered during his lifetime, Rasmussen was not named as the culprit until 2017, when DNA profiling connected him to the crime. Subsequent investigations led to Honeychurch and her daughters being identified as three of the four victims found in Allenstown; the identity of the fourth victim, his daughter, remains unknown. Since 2017, he has been named as a suspect in several other crimes.

Early life
Rasmussen was born on December 23, 1943, in Denver, Colorado. He grew up in Arizona and attended North High School in Phoenix until dropping out during his sophomore year in 1960. Rasmussen enlisted in the United States Navy in 1961 and served until he was discharged in 1967. He married in 1969, had four children and lived with his family in Phoenix and Redwood City, California. His wife left him and took the children in 1975 after he was arrested for aggravated assault. They last saw Rasmussen around December 1975 or 1976, when he showed up with an unidentified woman. The divorce was finalized in 1978.

Rasmussen lived in a number of states including Arizona, Colorado, Idaho, Virginia, Texas, Ohio, Oregon, Hawaii and California. He settled in New Hampshire sometime in the late 1970s. It was reported that he was known to travel with women and children. He often worked as an electrician for oil and gas companies. While living in Manchester, New Hampshire, Rasmussen lived under the alias "Robert 'Bob' Evans" and worked at the Waumbec Mill. Throughout 1980, he was arrested in Manchester three times for writing a bad check, theft, and diverting electric current. A woman named "Elizabeth Evans" was listed as his wife during his time in New Hampshire; this woman has never been identified.

Crimes

Bear Brook murders

By 1978, Rasmussen was dating Marlyse Elizabeth Honeychurch. Honeychurch was last seen in La Puente, California, on Thanksgiving day that year. After an argument with her family, she left with Rasmussen and her two daughters, six-year-old Marie Elizabeth Vaughn and one-year-old Sarah Lynn McWaters.

In November 1985, the bodies of Honeychurch and Vaughn were found in a barrel in Bear Brook State Park in Allenstown, New Hampshire. They were found to have died of blunt force trauma to their heads. A second barrel was found about 100 yards from the first one in 2000 containing the body of McWaters and an unidentified child aged between two and four years old. The identities of Honeychurch and her two children were not known until they were confirmed by DNA profiling in 2019. , the third child remains unidentified, but authorities were able to confirm that Rasmussen was her biological father.

Denise Beaudin and Lisa
While using the pseudonym Bob Evans, Rasmussen dated Denise Beaudin, who disappeared from Manchester, New Hampshire, after Thanksgiving of 1981 with her six-month-old daughter. Authorities believe that Rasmussen killed Beaudin somewhere in California, although her body has never been found. Beaudin was not reported missing at the time as her family believed she left town due to financial reasons.

Throughout the early 1980s, Rasmussen remained in possession of Beaudin's daughter, whom he called Lisa, and posed as her father. He was arrested in Cypress, California, in 1985 under the name Curtis Kimball for charges of driving under the influence and endangering the welfare of a child but failed to appear in court. He then took on the alias Gordon Jenson and abandoned the child at an RV park in Scotts Valley, California, in 1986. Rasmussen was arrested under another alias, Gerry Mockerman, in 1988 for driving a stolen vehicle. In 1989, he received a three-year prison sentence for child abandonment. Under a plea deal, an additional charge of child abuse was dropped. He was paroled in 1990 and subsequently absconded.

Eunsoon Jun
Rasmussen resurfaced in December 1999 under the pseudonym Larry Vanner when California-based chemist Eunsoon Jun introduced him to her family. The two were married in an unofficial ceremony in 2001. Jun disappeared in June 2002 and her body was found buried in cat litter in their home after having died from blunt force trauma to the head. He was arrested that November and pleaded no contest in 2003 to charges relating to her murder and dismemberment. He was sentenced to 15 years to life in jail.

The guilty plea came as a surprise to the court; Contra Costa County homicide detective Roxane Gruenheid has stated that she thinks he pleaded guilty after overhearing her say that she was going to request a paternity test for Lisa. A fingerprint match had confirmed that along with Vanner, he had previously used the aliases Jenson and Kimball, linking him to the child abandonment case. In 2003, the San Bernardino County Sheriff's Department opened a case to find Lisa's biological family. DNA evidence eventually found that he was not Lisa's father and the case spent years without any significant developments.

Rasmussen died, aged 67, while imprisoned at High Desert State Prison on December 28, 2010. His cause of death was a combination of lung cancer, chronic obstructive pulmonary disease and pneumonia.

Posthumous findings

San Bernardino detective Peter Headley got Lisa's case in 2013 and genealogy website databases had grown since the case had started. Aided by genetic genealogist Barbara Rae-Venter in 2015, Beaudin's daughter discovered her mother's identity and that the man she once thought had been her father was her kidnapper. This linked him to New Hampshire in the same timeframe as the Bear Brook murders, when he was known as Robert Evans. On January 26, 2017, authorities publicly announced that Evans was a suspect in the disappearance of Denise Beaudin and the Bear Brook murders.  Additionally, they announced that DNA confirmed that he was the father of the middle child found in Allenstown but that Evans was a pseudonym and his legal identity was not known.

Police released a video of a police interview of Evans in June 2017 in hopes of finding his true identity. Two months later, he was confirmed to be Rasmussen, through Y-DNA testing from a DNA sample contributed by one of his children from what is believed to be his first marriage. The use of genetic genealogy to identify Rasmussen represented new possibilities in forensic investigations. These techniques have since been used in other high-profile cases, including the Golden State Killer case, leading to the arrest of suspect Joseph James DeAngelo in April 2018.

New Hampshire investigators announced that the identities of Honeychurch, Vaughn and McWaters were confirmed through DNA testing in June 2019. The identities of the middle child, who Rasmussen fathered, and her mother remain unknown. Investigators believe that the mother of the child was also killed by Rasmussen.

Criminologist Jack Levin has stated that Rasmussen is unlike any serial killer he has ever studied, stating: "What distinguishes Rasmussen from most serial killers, is that he targeted people with whom he had a relationship. Most serial killers would never do that; it's the last thing they would do. Instead, they focus on complete strangers." He has been dubbed "The Chameleon Killer" due to his use of various aliases and his crime spree which stretched across the country.

Suspect in other crimes

Rasmussen lived a mile and a half away from 14-year-old Laureen Rahn when she disappeared from Manchester, New Hampshire, in April 1980. Denise Daneault, a 25-year-old woman who lived two blocks from the Rahn residence, went missing from a bar in June 1980. Daneault had been living on the same street as Rasmussen. Police and FBI agents conducted a search in Manchester after receiving an anonymous tip regarding Daneault in November 2017, after Rasmussen was announced as the Bear Brook killer. A second search was conducted in May 2018. By 2020, New Hampshire Senior Assistant Attorney General Jeff Strelzin said there was no "evidentiary connection" between Daneault and Rasmussen but that the interest in his case brought renewed attention to Daneault's disappearance.

Elizabeth Lamotte was 17 years old when she disappeared from the Youth Development Center in Manchester in 1984. She left the group home after receiving a furlough, so she was not reported missing until police were seeking more information on Rasmussen in 2017. At that time, a tipster speculated that she could have been the "Elizabeth Evans" that had been listed as Rasmussen's wife during his time in Manchester. However, DNA from Lamotte's relatives later proved that she was one of the victims in the Redhead murders, a series of unsolved homicides across the United States which are unrelated to Rasmussen. Lamotte had been found in Tennessee in 1985, killed about four months after her disappearance.

When Lisa was interviewed by detectives in 1986, they asked her if she had any siblings. She said that she did but "they died eating ‘grass mushrooms’ when they were out camping". Her answer led police to believe that Rasmussen killed them too.

San Joaquin County, California Assistant Sheriff John Huber speculated that Rasmussen may have been responsible for killing Amanda Schumann Deza, In 1995, her body was discovered by scavengers inside of a refrigerator which had been dumped in a canal. Like Rasmussen's confirmed victims, she had died of blunt force trauma to the head. Deza was identified by Othram on February 23, 2023. She was previously known as San Joaquin Jane Doe and the Lady in the Fridge.

See also 
 List of serial killers in the United States
 List of serial killers by number of victims

References

1943 births
2010 deaths
1977 murders in the United States
1978 murders in the United States
1979 murders in the United States
1980 murders in the United States
1981 murders in the United States
2002 murders in the United States
20th-century American criminals
21st-century American criminals
Allenstown, New Hampshire
American kidnappers
American male criminals
American murderers of children
American people convicted of murder
American people who died in prison custody
American prisoners sentenced to life imprisonment
American serial killers
Child abuse incidents and cases
Criminals from California
Criminals from Colorado
Criminals from New Hampshire
Criminals of the San Francisco Bay Area
Deaths from lung cancer in California
Deaths from pneumonia in California
Filicides in the United States
Infanticide
Male serial killers
Murder in California
Murder in New Hampshire
North High School (Phoenix, Arizona) alumni
People convicted of murder by California
People from Denver
People from Manchester, New Hampshire
Prisoners sentenced to life imprisonment by California
Prisoners who died in California detention
Serial killers who died in prison custody
United States Navy sailors
Uxoricides
Violence against women in the United States